The 2020 United States redistricting cycle is in progress following the completion of the 2020 United States census. In all fifty states, various bodies are re-drawing state legislative districts. States that are apportioned more than one seat in the United States House of Representatives are also drawing new districts for that legislative body.

The rules for redistricting vary from state to state, but all states draw new legislative and congressional maps either in the state legislature, in redistricting commissions, or through some combination of the state legislature and a redistricting commission. Though various laws and court decisions have put constraints on redistricting, many redistricting institutions continue to practice gerrymandering, which involves drawing new districts with the intention of giving a political advantage to specific groups. Political parties prepare for redistricting years in advance, and partisan control of redistricting institutions can provide a party with major advantages. Aside from the possibility of mid-decade redistricting, the districts drawn in the 2020 redistricting cycle will remain in effect until the next round of redistricting following the 2030 United States census.

United States House of Representatives

Reapportionment

Article One of the United States Constitution establishes the United States House of Representatives and apportions representatives to the states based on population, with reapportionment occurring every ten years. The decennial United States census determines the population of each state. Each of the fifty states is guaranteed at least one representative, and the Huntington–Hill method is used to assign the remaining 385 seats to states based on the population of each state. Congress has provided for reapportionment every ten years since the enactment of the Reapportionment Act of 1929. Since 1913, the U.S. House of Representatives has consisted of 435 members, a number set by statute, though the number of representatives temporarily increased in 1959. Reapportionment also affects presidential elections, as each state is guaranteed electoral votes equivalent to the number of representatives and senators representing the state.

Prior to the 2022 U.S. House elections, each state apportioned more than one representative will draw new congressional districts based on the reapportionment following the 2020 census. Based on the official counts of the 2020 census, California, Illinois, Michigan, New York, Ohio, Pennsylvania, and West Virginia will each lose one seat, while Colorado, Florida, Montana, North Carolina, and Oregon will each gain one seat, and Texas will gain two seats. Though California lost a seat for the first time in its history, the 2020 census continued a broader trend of Northeastern and Midwestern states losing seats and Western and Southern states gaining seats.

Congressional redistricting methods

Each U.S. representative represents one congressional district, which encompasses all or part of a single state. Every state with more than one congressional district must pass a new redistricting plan before the filing deadlines of the 2022 elections. In most states, the state legislature draws the new districts, but some states have established redistricting commissions. Arizona, California, Colorado, Idaho, Michigan, and Washington use independent commissions to draw House districts, while Hawaii and New Jersey use "politician commissions" to draw House districts. Alaska, Delaware, North Dakota, South Dakota, Vermont and Wyoming will continue to have only one representative in the House, and so will not have to draw new House districts.

In all other states, the legislature draws district lines, although some states have advisory commissions that can play a major role in drawing lines, and other states have backup commissions if the state legislature is unable to draw the lines itself. In many states, districts are drawn with the intent to benefit certain political groups, including one of the two major political parties, in a practice known as gerrymandering. Most states draw new lines by passing a law the same way any other law is passed, but some states have special procedures. Connecticut and Maine require a two-thirds super-majority in each house of the state legislature for redistricting plans, while district lines are not subject to gubernatorial veto in Connecticut and North Carolina. The Ohio redistricting process is designed to encourage the legislature to pass a map with bipartisan support, but the majority party can pass maps that last for four years (as opposed to the normal ten years) without the support of the minority party. The legislatures of Alabama, Indiana, Kentucky, Tennessee, and West Virginia can override gubernatorial vetoes with a simple majority vote, giving governors in those states little leverage in the drawing of new district maps.

Limits on congressional redistricting

Though the states have wide latitude in the re-drawing of congressional districts, state power over redistricting is subject to limits set by the U.S. Constitution, rulings of the federal judiciary and statutes passed by Congress. In the case of Wesberry v. Sanders, the Supreme Court of the United States established that states must draw districts that are equal in population "as nearly as is practicable." Subsequent court cases have required states to redistrict every ten years, although states can redistrict more often than that depending on their own statutes and constitutional provisions. Since the passage of the 1967 Uniform Congressional Districts Act, most states have been barred from using multi-member districts; all states currently use single-member districts. The Voting Rights Act of 1965 establishes protections against racial redistricting plans that would deny minority voters an equal opportunity to elect representatives of their choice. The Supreme Court case of Thornburg v. Gingles established a test to determine whether redistricting lines violate the Voting Rights Act. In some states, courts have required the creation of majority-minority districts.

In addition to standards required by federal law, many states have also adopted other criteria, including compactness, contiguity, and the preservation of political subdivisions (such as cities or counties) or communities of interest. Some states, including Arizona, Colorado, New York and Washington require the drawing of competitive districts.

Control of congressional redistricting

Congressional redistricting plans passed by legislature
The table shows the partisan control of states in which congressional redistricting is enacted through either a bill or a joint resolution passed by the legislature. States in which the governor can technically veto the bill, but that veto can be overridden by a simple majority of the state legislature, are marked as "simple maj. override".

"*" indicates that a 2/3 super-majority vote is required in the legislature
"↑" indicates that one party can override a gubernatorial veto because of a supermajority in the legislature
"†" indicates that the state employs an advisory commission
"‡" indicates that the state employs a back-up commission

Ohio requires certain qualified majorities, at each stage of its congressional redistricting process, for its congressional maps to endure (subject to judicial review) for the full decade.

Congressional redistricting plans passed by commissions

Six states with multiple members of the House of Representatives use independent commissions to draw congressional districts. In Arizona, Montana, and Washington, the four party leaders of the state house and state senate each select one member of the Independent Redistricting Commission, and these four members select a fifth member who is not affiliated with either party. In California, the Citizen's Redistricting Commission consists of five Democrats, five Republicans, and four individuals who are not members of either party. In Idaho, the four party leaders of the state house and state senate and the chairmen of the two most popular state parties (based on the results of the most recent gubernatorial vote) each select a member of the Commission for Reapportionment.

Two states use politician commissions to draw congressional districts. In Hawaii, the president of the state senate and the speaker of the state house each select two members of the Reapportionment Commission, while the minority parties in both chambers each appoint two members of the commission. The eight members of the commission then select a ninth member, who also chairs the commission. In New Jersey, the four party leaders of the state house and state senate and the party leaders of the two largest parties each choose two members of the Apportionment Commission, and the twelve members of the commission select a thirteenth member to chair the commission.

One state, Virginia, uses a hybrid, bipartisan commission consisting of eight legislators and eight non-legislator citizens. The commission is evenly divided between Democrats and Republicans.

Ohio employs a hybrid commission as a back-up redistricting authority in the case of the state legislature failing to achieve a certain qualified majority for approval of a map. The commission is composed of elected political officials as well as appointments made by the leaders of the state legislative chambers (namely: the speaker of the house, the leader of the largest party in the house to which the speaker of the house does not belong, the president of the senate, and the leader of the largest party in the senate to which the speaker of the senate does not belong), although those appointments also were politicians in the 2020 cycle. If the redistricting commission fails to achieve a certain qualified majority for approval of a congressional redistricting plan when it has been charged to do so, the authority to pass such a plan transfers back to the state legislature, which may then pass a plan either for the full decade via a certain qualified majority, or for only four years via normal legislative procedure otherwise.

State legislatures

Legislative redistricting methods

Each state draws new legislative district boundaries every ten years. Every state except Nebraska has a bicameral legislative branch. Nebraska is also unique in that it has the only legislative body that is officially non-partisan. Most states must pass redistricting plans by the time of the filing deadlines for the 2022 elections. The exceptions are Virginia and New Jersey, which must pass new plans in 2021, Louisiana and Mississippi which have a 2023 deadline, and Montana, which has a 2024 deadline.

Fifteen states use independent or politician commissions to draw state legislative districts. In the other states, the legislature is ultimately charged with drawing new lines, although some states have advisory or back-up commissions. Connecticut, Illinois, Mississippi, Oklahoma, and Texas have backup commissions that draw district lines if the legislature is unable to agree on new districts. Iowa, Maine, New York, Rhode Island, and Vermont employ advisory commissions. In Oregon, the Secretary of State will draw the legislative districts if the legislature fails to do so. In Connecticut and Maine, a 2/3 super-majority vote in each house is required to create new districts, while in Connecticut, Florida, Maryland, Mississippi, and North Carolina, the governor cannot veto redistricting plans. The legislatures of Alabama, Indiana, Kentucky, Tennessee, and West Virginia can override gubernatorial vetoes with a simple majority vote, giving governors in those states little leverage in the drawing of new district maps.

Limits on state legislative redistricting

The states have wide latitude in re-drawing legislative districts, but the U.S. Supreme Court case of Reynolds v. Sims established that states must draw districts that are "substantially equal" in population to one another. Federal court cases have established that deviation between the largest and smallest districts generally cannot be greater than ten percent, and some states have laws requiring less deviation. Court cases have also required states to redistrict every ten years, although states can redistrict more often than that depending on their own statutes and constitutional provisions. States are free to employ multi-member districts, and different districts can elect different numbers of legislators. The Voting Rights Act of 1965 establishes protections against racial redistricting plans that would deny minority voters an equal opportunity to elect representatives of their choice. The Supreme Court case of Thornburg v. Gingles established a test to determine whether redistricting lines violate the Voting Rights Act.

Many states have also adopted other criteria, including compactness, contiguity, and the preservation of political subdivisions (such as cities or counties) or communities of interest. Some states, including Arizona, require the drawing of competitive districts, while other states require the nesting of state house districts within state senate districts.

Control of legislative redistricting

State legislative redistricting plans passed by legislature
The table shows the partisan control of states in which state legislative redistricting is enacted via a bill passed by the legislature. States in which the governor can technically veto the bill, but that veto can be overridden by a simple majority of the state legislature, are marked as "simple maj. override".

An * indicates that a 2/3 super-majority vote is required in the legislature
A ↑ indicates that one party can override a gubernatorial veto because of a super-majority in the legislature
A † indicates that the state employs an advisory commission
A ‡ indicates that the state employs a backup commission

State legislative redistricting plans passed by commission

Eight states use independent commissions to draw state legislative districts. In Alaska, the governor appoints two individuals and the Speaker of the House, senate president, and Chief Justice of the Alaska Supreme Court each appoint one individual to the Redistricting Board. In Arizona, Montana, and Washington, the four legislative party leaders each appoint one member to the redistricting commission, and these four individuals choose a fifth member to chair the commission. California's Citizen's Redistricting Commission consists of five Democrats, five Republicans, and four individuals who are not members of either party. Idaho's Commission for Reapportionment consists of six individuals appointed by the chairmen of the two largest parties (based on the most recent gubernatorial vote) and the four state legislative party leaders.

Six states use politician commissions to draw state legislative districts. Arkansas's Board of Apportionment consists of the governor, secretary of state, and attorney general. The Ohio Redistricting Commission consists of the governor, auditor, secretary of state, and four individuals appointed by the state legislative party leaders. Hawaii's Reapportionment Commission consists of eight appointees of the state legislative party leaders, and these appointees select a ninth member to chair the commission. The New Jersey Apportionment Commission consists of twelve individuals appointed by the state legislative party leaders and the two major party chairmen, with these twelve individuals choosing a thirteenth member to chair the board. Pennsylvania's redistricting commission consists of four appointees chosen by the state legislative party leaders, and these four appointees choose a fifth member to chair the commission. In Missouri, a commission is created for each legislative chamber as a result of the governor picking from lists submitted by the leaders of the two major parties.

One state, Virginia, uses a hybrid, bipartisan commission consisting of eight legislators and eight non-legislator citizens. The commission is evenly divided between Democrats and Republicans.

Final disposition

This table shows the final status of redistricting in each state.

An * indicates that litigation is currently pending against the finalized maps

Litigation
Lawsuits have been filed against a number of passed congressional and legislative maps on the grounds of either racial gerrymandering or partisan gerrymandering. These states include Alabama, Alaska, Arkansas, Georgia, Idaho, Illinois, Maryland, Michigan, Nevada, New Jersey, New Mexico, North Carolina, Ohio, and Texas. As more states continue to adopt maps through the redistricting process, the number of lawsuits filed will potentially increase.

Racial gerrymandering
Lawsuits have been filed in multiple states against congressional and state legislative maps due to claims that the new maps disenfranchise minority voters.

In Alabama, four lawsuits were filed against the congressional and state legislative maps, alleging racial bias and violation of the Voting Rights Act of 1965 (VRA) by diluting the power of minority voters in the state. On January 24, 2022, a three-judge panel blocked Alabama's congressional maps over claims it likely violates the VRA. The panel argued that because African Americans counted for a considerable percentage of the total population growth, there should be more opportunities for representation. On February 7, 2022, the Supreme Court temporarily reinstated Alabama's congressional map and added Alabama's appeal to their 2022 case list, with the hearing date yet to be decided.

The NAACP and American Civil Liberties Union sued multiple state officials in Arkansas over the new state House districts, arguing that they unconstitutionally underrepresented Black voters. A US District judge ruled that the groups did not have standing, and stated that the plaintiff must be the US Attorney General in February, 2022. The ACLU appealed the ruling following the decision by the United States Department of Justice not to intervene. US Senator Tom Cotton filed an amicus brief with the court supporting the state of Arkansas, calling racial gerrmandering accusations "baseless". Two lawsuits were also filed against Arkansas's congressional districts, arguing that the map disenfranchised black voters by splitting Pulaski County between three congressional districts and moving 23,000 black voters out of Arkansas's 2nd congressional district.

In Georgia, staff attorneys at the Southern Poverty Law Center claimed that, "the maps produced out of the special legislative session block Georgia’s communities of color from obtaining political representation that reflects their population growth”. The American Civil Liberties Union of Georgia filed suit in December 2021, alleging that both state legislative maps and congressional maps violated the VRA. Specifically, the 6th, 13th, and 14th congressional districts were challenged. In March 2022, Judge Steve C. Jones allowed Georgia's congressional and state legislative maps to take effect for the 2022 Georgia state elections even though he believed that it was likely “that certain aspects of the State’s redistricting plans are unlawful.” Despite this, he decided that overturning Georgia's maps so close to the May primary would prove overly disruptive.

Both congressional and state legislature maps drawn by the Michigan Independent Citizens Redistricting Commission were challenged in court for violating the VRA by reducing the number of Black-majority districts in Detroit. While supporters claim that this allows Black voters to elect more Black-aligned candidates across a larger number of districts, opponents argue that this dilutes the power of Black voters. The lawsuit against both the state legislative districts and the congressional districts was dismissed on February 3, 2022, due to insufficient evidence that the redistricting commission needed to create the same number of Black-majority districts.

In Texas, the League of United Latin American Citizens and others filed a lawsuit against congressional and state legislative maps after they had passed the state legislature, but before they had been signed into law. They argued that despite over 50% of Texas's population growth over the past ten years being due to Hispanic citizens, the maps not only failed to add new Hispanic majority districts, but also eliminated several existing districts, violating the Voting Rights Act. Republican state legislators claim that the maps were drawn without taking race into account, and that their legal counsel had previously advised them that the maps were legal under federal law. In December 2021, the Department of Justice also filed a lawsuit against Texas's new congressional and state house maps, arguing that they "were drawn with discriminatory intent".

Partisan gerrymandering
In Maryland, new congressional maps were vetoed by Governor Larry Hogan for being "disgracefully gerrymandered", but the Maryland state legislature overrode his veto on December 9, 2021. Subsequently, two Republican aligned groups sued to overturn the new congressional maps, arguing that they were partisan gerrymanders that "cracked" Republican voters across several districts, diluting their voting power. Primaries in the state were delayed to July 19 due to the ongoing litigation. On March 25, a circuit court judge threw out the congressional districts, calling them an "extreme gerrymander" that disenfranchised multiple communities of interest.

New York's congressional, state assembly, and state senate districts were thrown out by a New York state judge on March 31, 2022, for violating a state Constitutional provision banning partisan gerrymandering. On April 21, 2022, a New York appeals court upheld the ruling that New York's congressional maps were drawn with illegal partisan intent, but they reinstated the state assembly and state senate districts. Upon a second appeal by the state Democratic party, The New York State Court of Appeals found that the congressional and state senate districts were “drawn with impermissible partisan purpose.” As such, both maps were found unconstitutional, and Carnegie Mellon University post-doctoral fellow Jonathan Cervas was appointed as an independent special master to draw new maps. Federal Judge Gary L. Sharpe of the Northern District of New York delayed New York's congressional and state senate primaries to August in May 2022, rejecting an argument from state Democrats that the primary must take place in June, and so it was too late to redrawn new maps. He called the argument "a Hail Mary pass, the object of which is to take a long-shot try at having the New York primaries conducted on district lines that the state says is unconstitutional".

The Supreme Court of Ohio overturned initially passed state legislative maps, arguing that they unfairly favored Republicans against the guidance of Ohio's 2015 redistricting amendment that seeks to limit partisan gerrymandering.

The Republican Party of New Mexico sued to overturn the new congressional maps, arguing that they unduly favor Democrats and dilute Republican voting strength, thereby violating the equal protection clause of the New Mexico state constitution. New Mexico Governor Michelle Lujan Grisham characterized the congressional map as one "in which no one party or candidate may claim any undue advantage."

In February 2022, the North Carolina Supreme Court struck down both state legislative maps and the congressional map initially passed by the state legislature in November 2021, citing partisan gerrymandering that violated the state Constitution. As a result, the North Carolina legislature drafted new maps, which they submitted to the court for approval. A three-judge panel of the court upheld the legality of both state legislative maps, but had court-appointed special masters redraw the congressional map, which was released and approved in February 2022.

Court-run redistricting
State supreme courts have selected or drafted new congressional maps in Connecticut, Minnesota, North Carolina, New Hampshire, Pennsylvania, Virginia, and Wisconsin following the failure of redistricting panels or lawmakers to pass new maps in each state.

The Connecticut Supreme Court was forced to take over the congressional redistricting process after the bipartisan legislative panel deadlocked and failed to agree on new maps. The court appointed Nathaniel Persily, who drew Connecticut's 2010 maps, as special master to draw the new congressional districts. Persily drew a least-change map, making only the adjustments necessary to ensure equal population in each congressional district. The court adopted Persily's recommended map on February 10, 2022.

In North Carolina, local and state courts took over the congressional redistricting process in February 2022. After initial congressional and legislative maps were ruled as unconstitutional partisan gerrymanders, several nonpartisan redistricting experts including Robert H. Edmunds Jr., Thomas W. Ross, and Robert F. Orr were appointed as special masters by the state Supreme Court. They were tasked with reviewing whether the second iteration of state legislative and congressional maps passed by the North Carolina legislature violated state Constitution provisions opposing partisan gerrymandering. The special masters in coordination with the Wake County Superior Court found that the new congressional map was unconstitutional, and instead implemented their own map on February 23, 2022. North Carolina House Speaker Tim Moore called the process "egregious" and "unconstitutional", and accused the court of drawing the maps "in an unknown, black-box manner".

Following the failure of the Minnesota Legislature to pass either congressional or state legislative districts by the mandated February 5, 2022, deadline, the Minnesota Supreme Court appointed a five-member commission to draw new boundaries. The panel released the state's new maps later in February.

Redistricting organizations and funds
Democrats were particularly unhappy with the results of the 2012 House elections in which Democratic House candidates received more votes than Republican House candidates, but Republicans retained control of the chamber. Organizations such as the Democratic Governors Association and the Democratic Legislative Campaign Committee have established funds dedicated to helping Democrats in the 2020 round of redistricting.
Democrats also established the National Democratic Redistricting Committee to coordinate Democratic redistricting efforts. Republicans established a similar group, the National Republican Redistricting Trust.

Changes to the redistricting process since 2012

Federal court rulings
In the 2013 case, Shelby County v. Holder, the Supreme Court struck down Section 4(b) of the Voting Rights Act, which was a coverage formula that determined which states and counties required preclearance from the Justice Department before making changes to voting laws and procedures. The formula had covered states with a history of minority voter disenfranchisement, and the preclearance procedure was designed to block discriminatory voting practices. In the 2019 case of Rucho v. Common Cause, the Supreme Court held that claims of partisan gerrymandering present nonjusticiable political questions that cannot be reviewed by federal courts.

In another 2019 case, Department of Commerce v. New York, the Supreme Court blocked the Trump administration from adding a question to the 2020 census regarding the citizenship of respondents.

State court rulings
In 2015, the Supreme Court of Florida ordered the state to draw a new congressional map on the basis of a 2010 state constitutional amendment that banned partisan gerrymandering.

In 2018, the Pennsylvania Supreme Court threw out the 2011 U.S. House of Representatives map on the grounds that it violated the state constitution; the court established new redistricting standards requiring districts to be compact and to minimize the splitting of counties and towns.

In 2019, a North Carolina state court struck down the state's legislative districts on the grounds that the district had been created with the partisan intent of favoring Republican candidates.

In 2022, the Ohio Supreme Court struck down the state's congressional and legislative districts no fewer than five times in total.

Ballot measures
In 2015, Ohio voters approved a ballot measure changing the composition of the commission charged with drawing state legislative districts, adding two legislative appointees to the commission and creating rules and guidelines designed to make partisan gerrymandering more difficult. In May 2018, Ohio voters approved a proposal that modified the state's congressional redistricting processes.

In 2018, voters in Colorado and Michigan approved of a proposal to establish an independent redistricting commission for congressional and state legislative districts in their respective states. In Utah, voters approved the creation of a redistricting commission to draw congressional and state legislative districts, though the Utah state legislature retains the power to reject these maps.

In 2020, voters in Virginia approved the establishment of a bipartisan redistricting commission for both congressional and state legislative redistricting. The commission consists of eight legislators and eight non-legislator citizens, with the commission split evenly between Democrats and Republicans.

In 2018, Missouri voters approved of a proposal to have a non-partisan state demographer draw state legislative districts, but in 2020 Missouri voters approved a second referendum eliminating the state demographer position and restoring the system in place prior to the 2018 referendum.

See also
 2017, 2018, 2019, 2020, and 2021 United States elections
 Gerrymandering in the United States
 Redistricting in the United States
 Electoral geography

Notes

References

External links
 
 

Redistricting in the United States
Electoral geography of the United States